Where's my Gold? EP is the second release from British band Kid Galahad. Two tracks on this release, "Where's my Gold?" and "I Don't Wanna Play", were recorded in the studio and produced by Jim Abbiss who had previously worked with artists such as UNKLE and DJ Shadow.  Whilst "Green Painted Lady" and "Consoul" were both demo recordings, produced by the band before signing to Ignition Records.

The EP was generally well received and was made "single of the week" by MTV.  "I Don't Wanna Play" featured in the UK Channel 4 comedy drama Teachers.

Track listing
All tracks written by A.Bull, D.Ody, P.Seaman, D.Strows
"Where's my Gold?" – 3:59
"Green Painted Lady" – 3:24
"Consoul" – 4:53
"I Don't Wanna Play" – 8:23

Personnel
Ash Bull – vocals
Dave Ody – Guitar
Paul Seaman – Bass guitar
D. "Wookie" Strows – drums
Jim Abbiss – Production and Mixing (Tracks 1 and 4)
Kid Galahad - Production and Mixing (Tracks 2 and 3)

References

Kid Galahad (band) albums
2001 EPs